The Sun Shines Bright is a 1953 American Comedy-Drama Western film directed by John Ford, based on material taken from a series of Irvin S. Cobb "Judge Priest" short stories featured in The Saturday Evening Post in the 1910s, specifically "The Sun Shines Bright", "The Mob from Massac", and "The Lord Provides".

Ford had adapted some of the same material in 1934 in his film Judge Priest. That film originally had a scene depicting an attempted lynching of Poindexter (and Priest’s condemnation of the act), but it was cut by 20th Century Fox. The omission was one of the reasons Ford loosely reshaped the Cobb stories two decades later as The Sun Shines Bright for Republic Pictures, this time including Judge Priest's defusing of the mob determined to lynch a young black character named Woodford. In both films, Stepin Fetchit plays the part of Judge Priest's assistant, Poindexter. Ford often cited The Sun Shines Bright as his favorite among all his films, and in later years, it was championed by critics such as Jonathan Rosenbaum and Dave Kehr, who called it "a masterpiece".

Plot
In post-reconstruction United States, black sheep Ashby Corwin returns to his native Kentucky on a steamboat. He encounters young Lucy Lee, ward of Dr. Lake, and is struck by her beauty.

In court, Judge Billy Priest, who is a candidate for reelection to his post, adjudicates a number of cases, including finding a job for "Uncle Plez" Woodford's idle nephew, U. S. Grant Woodford. Ashby learns that while old General Fairfield is said to be the grandfather of Lucy, he denies it. On the street, after Lucy is the subject of insults by Buck Ramsey about her true heritage, Ashby gets into a whip fight with Buck before the judge comes by and puts a stop to it.

Lucy eventually discovers who her real mother is: a prostitute recently returned to town. Meanwhile, the daughter of Rufe Ramsuer is assaulted and young Woodford is blamed and arrested, causing racial tensions to rise and a large lynch mob to form. Violence seems imminent until Judge Priest confronts the mob at the jailhouse and defuses the confrontation with an eloquent and brilliant argument. Later, Rufe's daughter points to Buck as being her true attacker.

It is election day. Those in the lynch mob realize that Judge Priest has saved them from themselves, and they vote for him en masse, producing a tie with the other candidate, Horace K. Maydew (played by Milburn Stone). It is pointed out to the judge that he hasn't yet remembered to cast a ballot himself, so he wins reelection by a single vote: his own.

Cast

 Charles Winninger as Judge William Pittman Priest
 Arleen Whelan as Lucy Lee Lake
 John Russell as Ashby Corwin
 Stepin Fetchit as Jeff Poindexter
 Russell Simpson as Dr. Lewt Lake
 Ludwig Stössel as Herman Felsburg (as Ludwig Stossel)
 Francis Ford as Feeney (Old Backwoodsman)
 Paul Hurst as Army Sgt. Jimmy Bagby
 Mitchell Lewis as Sheriff Andy Redcliffe
 Grant Withers as Buck Ramsey
 Milburn Stone as Horace K. Maydew
 Dorothy Jordan as Lucy Lee's mother
 Elzie Emanuel as U.S. Grant 'You Ess' Woodford
 Henry O'Neill as Joe D. Habersham
 Slim Pickens as Sterling, Lanky Backwoodsman
 James Kirkwood as General Fairfield
 Ernest Whitman as Pleasant 'Uncle Plez' Woodford
 Trevor Bardette as Rufe Ramseur
 Eve March as Mallie Cramp
 Hal Baylor as Rufe Ramseur Jr.
 Jane Darwell as Mrs. Aurora Ratchitt
 Ken Williams as Maydew's Henchman
 Clarence Muse as Uncle Zack
 Mae Marsh as G.A.R. Woman at the Ball

Release
The film was entered into the 1953 Cannes Film Festival.

Herbert J. Yates, the head of Republic Pictures, had about ten minutes cut from the film against Ford's wishes. According to film historian Joseph McBride, the full 100-minute version (which did play theatrically overseas) was rediscovered when Republic inadvertently used it as a master for the 1990 videotape release. This full version is currently available from Olive Films as a high-definition Blu-ray release.

See also
 John Ford filmography

References

External links

1953 films
1950s historical comedy-drama films
American Western (genre) films
1953 Western (genre) films
American black-and-white films
Remakes of American films
American historical comedy-drama films
Films about elections
Films based on short fiction
Films directed by John Ford
Films scored by Victor Young
Films set in Kentucky
Films set in the 1890s
Republic Pictures films
1950s English-language films
1950s American films